Ronald Penny,  (28 December 1936 – 21 December 2019) was an Australian immunologist who made the first diagnosis of HIV/AIDS in Australia in 1982.

Early life
Penny was born in Warsaw, Poland in 1936, and in 1938 his Jewish family settled in Australia as religious refugees.

Medical career
In 1960, Penny graduated with honours from Sydney Medical School, and undertook further study in haematology, oncology and immunology in Britain and the United States. In 1967, he returned to Australia and began work at Sydney's Royal Prince Alfred Hospital, where he set up the first clinical immunology unit in New South Wales. Two years later, the unit was transferred to St Vincent's Hospital.

In October 1982, Penny and his team at St Vincent's made the first diagnosis of HIV/AIDS in Australia, just over a year after the first clinical reporting of the disease in the United States. In 1983, Penny conducted a survey in New South Wales to better understand the connection between the spread of AIDS, sexual behaviour, and drug usage. He used anonymization methods to protect the respondents from legal jeopardy based on their responses. In addition to identifying sources of primary HIV infection, Penny also worked to address the community and public health aspects of the epidemic, from debunking misconceptions about the transmission of HIV and the resulting discrimination against homosexual men, and adjusting community behaviour to better control transmission such as condom use and safer intravenous drug use.

Awards and honours
In the 1993 Queen's Birthday Honours, Penny was made an Officer of the Order of Australia (AO) for "service to medical research and education particularly in the field of clinical immunology".

References

External links

1936 births
2019 deaths
Australian immunologists
HIV/AIDS researchers
Officers of the Order of Australia
Sydney Medical School alumni
University of New South Wales alumni
Academic staff of the University of New South Wales
Fellows of the Royal Australasian College of Physicians
Polish emigrants to Australia
Australian people of Polish-Jewish descent
Australian Jews